The Shuram excursion, or Shuram-Wonoka excursion, is a change in δ13C, or in the ratio of carbon-13 to carbon-12, taking place between around 573 and 562 million years ago, during the Ediacaran Period. It was first noticed in the Wonoka Formation in South Australia in 1990 and later in the Shuram Formation in Oman in 1993. It is the largest negative δ13C excursion in Earth history, and recovery took 50 million years.

It is not known what caused the excursion. The Shuram excursion may have played a role in sparking the rise of animals that resulted later in the Cambrian explosion. The oxygen-consuming Ediacara biota experienced a radiation during the isotopic excursion as a response to the transient surplus of oxidants.

References

Ediacaran